Following is a list of notable architects from Lithuania.

A

Kęstutis Antanėlis (born 1951)

B

Gediminas Baravykas (1940-1995)
Edmundas Benetis (born 1953)

Č

Vytautas Čekanauskas (1930-2010)
Nikolajus Čiaginas (1823-1909)

D

Rytis Daukantas
Klaudijus Dušauskas (1891-1959)

G

Laurynas Gucevičius (1753-1798)

K

Algirdas Kaušpėdas (born 1953)
Martynas Knakfusas (1740-1821)
Alfredas Kulpa-Kulpavičius (1923-2007)

L

Kęstutis Lupeikis (born 1962)

M

Kiprijonas Maculevičius (1830-1906)

N

Algimantas Nasvytis (1928-2018)

P

Karolis Podčasinskis (1790-1860)

V

Gediminas Valiuškis (1927-1999)
Jonas Virakas (1905-1988)
Antanas Vivulskis (1877-1919)

Ž

Tomas Žebrauskas (1714-1758)

See also

 List of architects
 List of Lithuanians

Lithuania
Architects